Oleg Antonov may refer to:

 Oleg Antonov (aircraft designer) (1906–1984), Soviet aircraft designer
 Oleg Antonov (volleyball) (born 1988), Russian-born Italian volleyball player